The 5th Seiyu Awards ceremony was held on March 5, 2011 in Tokyo. The period of general voting lasted from Oct 22, 2010 to Jan 1, 2011.  Some awards were given in February, ahead of the ceremony.  

Winners are listed below.

References

Seiyu Awards ceremonies
Seiyu
Seiyu
2011 in Japanese cinema
2011 in Japanese television